The International Festival of Kraków Composers (Międzynarodowy Festiwal Kompozytorów Krakowskich) is a contemporary music festival that has been held in Kraków, Poland since 1989. It is one of the two major festivals of its kind held each year in Poland, the other being the Warsaw Autumn. The festival presents numerous concerts of music by composers with a connection to Kraków, as well as contemporary pieces from around the world. In addition there are workshops and lectures. Overall responsibility for the festival rests with The Krakow Branch of the Polish Composers’ Union. From about 1993 up until 2013 the festival was directed by the musicologist Jerzy Stankiewicz, and since 2014 the director has been Marcel Chyrzyński.

The 2018 International Festival of Kraków Composers ran from the 14th to the 22nd of April; the official festival website is located here. The opening concert of the festival took place at the Karol Szymanowski Philharmonic in Kraków. Although the festival is normally held in the Northern spring, the 2020 event was postponed until October because of the COVID-19 pandemic. For the same reason the 2021 festival will be a completely online event.

A listing of all works performed at the festival from 1989 through to 2019 is available here.

References

Music festivals in Poland
Events in Kraków
20th-century classical music
20th century in music
Modernism (music)
Contemporary classical music festivals
Experimental music festivals
Classical music festivals in Poland